The Penfeld is a  French coastal river. The town of Brest, in Finistère, has grown up on its left (east) bank.

Course
Its source is in the town of Gouesnou. It then passes through Bohars and Guilers (a village bears the river's name) before it flows out into the roadstead of Brest. The Penfeld runs along the former course of the river Aulne, shifted to the west by the opening of the goulet of the roadstead of Brest by the interglacial periods of the Quaternary Era.

At Brest, the Penfeld is crossed by the Pont de l’Harteloire then, some way downstream, by the Pont de Recouvrance, the largest vertical-lift bridge in Europe until it was dethroned by the Pont Gustave-Flaubert in 2007.

See also 

 Pont de l'Harteloire
 Pont National — Pont de Recouvrance
 Recouvrance
 Arsenal de Brest

References 

0Penfeld
Geography of Brest, France
Rivers of France
Rivers of Brittany
Rivers of Finistère